Moste is a settlement in the Municipality of Komenda in the Upper Carniola region of Slovenia.

Church

The local church is dedicated to Saint Sebastian. It was severely damaged in the 1895 Ljubljana earthquake and was entirely repaired and repainted. More recently, restoration work was again undertaken between 1995 and 1996, when new stained glass windows were added.

References

External links

Moste on Geopedia

Populated places in the Municipality of Komenda